Borck is a German surname. Notable people with the surname include:

 Hans-Georg Borck (1921–2011), German Hauptmann 
 Charles Borck (1917–2008), Filipino basketball player
 Walter Borck (1891–1949), German international footballer

 Sergeant Borck, 1955 West-German drama film

German-language surnames